Myriem Roussel (born in Rabat, Morocco, 26 December 1961) is a French actress. She is best-known for her role as Marie in Jean-Luc Godard's 1985 film Je Vous Salue Marie/Hail Mary, which was controversial at the time. She had come to Godard's attention when she appeared as an extra in Passion. Other film appearances include The Patriots (1994), Dark at Noon (1993), the 1985 adaptation of Yasunari Kawabata's 1964 novel Beauty and Sadness, and First Name: Carmen (1983)

References

External links

French film actresses
1961 births
Living people